Carex nervata, also known as nerved-mitra sedge, is a tussock-forming species of perennial sedge in the family Cyperaceae. It is native to far eastern parts of Russia, Mongolia, Manchuria, Japan and Korea.

See also
List of Carex species

References

nervata
Taxa named by Adrien René Franchet
Taxa named by Ludovic Savatier
Plants described in 1878
Flora of Japan
Flora of Korea
Flora of Manchuria
Flora of Primorsky Krai
Flora of Mongolia